Perfect is a 1985 American romantic drama film directed by James Bridges and distributed by Columbia Pictures. It was written by Aaron Latham and James Bridges and is based on a series of articles that appeared in Rolling Stone magazine in the late 1970s, chronicling the popularity of Los Angeles health clubs among single people. Its story follows journalist Adam Lawrence, who is assigned to interview a successful entrepreneur accused of dealing drugs. He is then assigned to cover a second story and decides to do an exposé on fitness clubs, where he meets an aerobics instructor named Jessie Wilson, who does not have a great deal of trust in journalists. It stars John Travolta, Jamie Lee Curtis, Anne De Salvo, Marilu Henner, Laraine Newman, Matthew Reed, and Jann Wenner.

The film was produced by Delphi III and Pluperfect and was released on June 7, 1985. It grossed $4.2 million during its opening weekend and $12.9 million worldwide, against a budget of $20 million.

Plot
Rolling Stone reporter Adam Lawrence (John Travolta) is sent from New York to Los Angeles to write an article about a businessman arrested for dealing drugs. During his stay in L.A., Adam sees a chance to collect material for another story about how "Fitness clubs are the singles bars of the '80s". He visits "The Sport Connection," a popular gym where he meets workout instructor Jessie Wilson (Jamie Lee Curtis) and asks her for an interview. Because of a previous bad experience with the press when she was a competitive swimmer, Jessie declines.

Adam joins the fitness club and soon coaxes other club members to tell him about the gym and its impact on their love lives. Some, such as fun-loving Linda and Sally, are all too candid about their experiences with the opposite sex. Although she doesn't agree to be a part of his story, a romance does ultimately develop between Jessie and Adam, resulting in a moral dilemma; as a journalist he has lost his objective point of view.

Jessie comes to trust him. Less cynical than before, Adam makes a determined effort to show Jessie that not all journalists are out for the cheap sensation. He writes an in-depth, fair-minded analysis of fitness clubs as a singles meeting scene. But it is deemed unacceptable by his boss, Rolling Stone's editor in chief Mark Roth (Jann Wenner).

Adam's article is turned over to others for editing, using material supplied by his colleague Frankie, a photographer. She finds an old magazine article featuring embarrassing details about a romance involving Jessie. Adam travels to Morocco for another assignment, unaware of the changes being made in his story; he finds out too late to stop it. This has devastating impact on Jessie, as well as on others like Sally and Linda, described as "the most used piece of equipment in the gym."

Adam tries to explain the whole situation to Jessie, but can't. Meanwhile, he must attend a trial at which he's supposed to testify. As a reporter, using rights granted by the First Amendment, he decides not to comply with a judge who orders Adam to hand over tapes from the businessman's interview. Adam is jailed for contempt of court.

Jessie can see that Adam is a man of his word and believes him that he did not write the article the way it appeared in Rolling Stone.

Cast

 John Travolta  as Adam Lawrence
 Jamie Lee Curtis as Jessie Wilson
 Jann Wenner as Mark Roth
 Marilu Henner as Sally Marcus
 Laraine Newman as Linda Slater
 Anne De Salvo as Frankie
 Mathew Reed as Roger
 John Napierala as City News Editor
 Stefan Gierasch as Charlie
 Ramey Ellis as City News Receptionist
 Alma Beltran as Grieving Woman
 Perla Walter as Grieving Woman
 Gina Morelli as Grieving Woman
 Philippe Delgrange as Maitre d' in New York
 Tom Schiller as Carly Simon's Friend
 Paul Kent as Judge
 Murphy Dunne as Peckerman
 Kenneth Welsh as Joe McKenzie
 Michael Laskin as Government Prosecutor
 Robert Stark as Government Prosecutor
 Laurie Burton as Mrs. McKenzie
 Ann Travolta as Mary
 Nanette Pattee-Francini as Nanette
 Steven J. Zmed as hypochondriacal hustler
 Robin Samuel as Robin
 Robert Parr as Robert  
 Rosalind Ingledew as Sterling
 Chelsea Field as Randy
 Paul Barresi as naturally muscled gym patron
 Kenny Griswold as Kenny
 Ronnie Claire Edwards as Melody Wilson
 Julie Fulton as Marta Young
 Carly Simon as herself
 Lauren Hutton as herself

Reception
Vincent Canby of The New York Times wrote that the film "is too superficially knowing to be a camp classic, but it's an unintentionally hilarious mixture of muddled moralizing and all-too-contemporary self-promotion," and noted that "Rolling Stone receives more reverent treatment in 'Perfect' than The Washington Post received in 'All the President's Men.'" Variety wrote, "Set in the world of journalism, pic is guilty of the sins it condemns — superficiality, manipulation and smugness. On any level, 'Perfect' is an embarrassment and unlikely to satisfy any audience." Gene Siskel of the Chicago Tribune gave the film two-and-a-half stars out of four and wrote, "What's missing is any real development of a relationship between Travolta and Curtis. Yes, she bawls him out a couple of times about his journalism techniques, but all is forgotten in the film's happy-go-lucky ending that also cheaps out what has gone on before." Sheila Benson of the Los Angeles Times stated of the film that "any claim its makers, producer-director James Bridges and co-writer Aaron Latham, have to seriousness dissolves as the film becomes more voyeuristic and manipulative than the profession it indicts," adding that "Travolta performs with no edge to his character whatsoever, and the direction further confuses things by never letting us understand whether he's generally unprincipled or just a regular guy who from time to time does lousy things." Paul Attanasio of The Washington Post called the film "a trashy movie about women jumping up and down in leotards, but it's also more (and less) than that, a look at the wages of the free press. Despite a number of fine performances, a few good hoots and more daunting bodies, it's far from perfect. It touts the First Amendment like a corny romance from the '40s—stars and stripes in spandex." Paul Willistein of The Morning Call wrote, "'Perfect' isn't perfect, but it at least tries to inject some serious themes into a movie that is essentially summer fluff."

Perfect was nominated for three Golden Raspberry Awards: Worst Actor (John Travolta), Worst Supporting Actress (Marilu Henner) and Worst Screenplay. The movie was nominated for a Stinkers Bad Movie Awards for Worst Picture. As of May 2022, it holds a 19% rating on Rotten Tomatoes based on sixteen reviews. In a 1994 interview with Rolling Stone magazine, Quentin Tarantino called the movie "greatly underappreciated."

The film is listed in Golden Raspberry Award founder John Wilson's book The Official Razzie Movie Guide as one of The 100 Most Enjoyably Bad Movies Ever Made. On October 16, 2015, the film was covered on the podcast for bad movies How Did This Get Made?

Soundtrack

The soundtrack to Perfect was initially released in 1985 as a 12" vinyl record, and later re-released on CD.

Side A
 "(Closest Thing To) Perfect" (Jermaine Jackson) – 3:50
 "I Sweat (Going Through the Motions)" (Nona Hendryx) – 3:54
 "All Systems Go" (Pointer Sisters) – 3:48
 "Shock Me" (Jermaine Jackson and Whitney Houston) – 5:08
 "Wham Rap! (Enjoy What You Do)" (Wham!) – 4:43

Side B
 "Wear Out the Grooves" (Jermaine Stewart) – 4:33
 "Hot Hips" (Lou Reed) – 3:33
 "Talking to the Wall" (Dan Hartman) – 3:59
 "Masquerade" (Berlin) – 3:48
 "Lay Your Hands on Me" (Thompson Twins) – 4:11

Filming locations
 "Sports Connection" fitness centre scenes were filmed in actual Sports Connection fitness club (now Sports Club/LA, a gigantic athletic facility in West Los Angeles), known as a place for singles to meet.
 In the opening scene, the camera pans in on The Jersey Journal sign in Jersey City.

References

External links
 
 

1985 films
1985 romantic drama films
American romantic drama films
1980s English-language films
Films about journalists
Films based on newspaper and magazine articles
Rolling Stone
Films directed by James Bridges
Films set in Los Angeles
Columbia Pictures films
Films about Olympic swimming and diving
Films about the 1980 Summer Olympics
Films about computing
1980s American films